Atanasov Ridge (‘Atanasov Rid’ \a-ta-'na-sov 'rid\) is the partly ice-covered rocky ridge extending 3.8 km in south-southeast to north-northwest direction and 2.1 km wide, rising to 744 m on the southwest side of Elgar Uplands, northern Alexander Island in Antarctica. It surmounts Gilbert Glacier to the southwest.

The feature is named after the Bulgarian composer Georgi Atanasov (1882-1931).

Location
British mapping in 1971.

Maps
 British Antarctic Territory. Scale 1:200000 topographic map. DOS 610 – W 69 70. Tolworth, UK, 1971
 Antarctic Digital Database (ADD). Scale 1:250000 topographic map of Antarctica. Scientific Committee on Antarctic Research (SCAR). Since 1993, regularly upgraded and updated

Notes

References
 Bulgarian Antarctic Gazetteer. Antarctic Place-names Commission. (details in Bulgarian, basic data in English)
 Atanasov Ridge. SCAR Composite Gazetteer of Antarctica

External links
 Atanasov Ridge. Copernix satellite image

Mountains of Alexander Island
Bulgaria and the Antarctic